Bojan Gjorgievski (born 25 January 1992) is a Macedonian footballer who plays as a right back for FK Kit-Go Pehčevo.

Club career
In July 2016, Georgievski signed a contract with Bulgarian side Neftochimic Burgas but was released after six months.

In the summer 2020, Gjorgievski joined Macedonian second division club Bregalnica Štip.

Notes

External links
 

1992 births
Living people
Footballers from Skopje
Association football fullbacks
Macedonian footballers
North Macedonia youth international footballers
North Macedonia under-21 international footballers
FK Vardar players
FK Metalurg Skopje players
FC BATE Borisov players
Skonto FC players
FK Horizont Turnovo players
Neftochimic Burgas players
FK Pobeda players
FK Mačva Šabac players
KF Teuta Durrës players
FK Rabotnički players
FK Shkupi players
FK Bregalnica Štip players
Macedonian First Football League players
Latvian Higher League players
First Professional Football League (Bulgaria) players
Serbian SuperLiga players
Kategoria Superiore players
Macedonian Second Football League players
Macedonian expatriate footballers
Expatriate footballers in Latvia
Macedonian expatriate sportspeople in Latvia
Expatriate footballers in Bulgaria
Macedonian expatriate sportspeople in Bulgaria
Expatriate footballers in Serbia
Macedonian expatriate sportspeople in Serbia
Expatriate footballers in Albania
Macedonian expatriate sportspeople in Albania